In linguistics, linguistic competence is the system of unconscious knowledge that one knows when they know a language. It is distinguished from linguistic performance, which includes all other factors that allow one to use one's language in practice. 

In approaches to linguistics which adopt this distinction, competence would normally be considered responsible for the fact that "I like ice cream" is a possible sentence of English, the particular proposition that it denotes, and the particular sequence of phones that it consists of. Performance, on the other hand, would be responsible for the real-time processing required to produce or comprehend it, for the particular role it plays in a discourse, and for the particular sound wave one might produce while uttering it.

The distinction is widely adopted in formal linguistics, where competence and performance are typically studied independently. However, it is not used in other approaches including functional linguistics and cognitive linguistics, and it has been criticized in particular for turning performance into a wastebasket for hard-to-handle phenomena.

Competence versus performance

Linguistic theory is concerned primarily with an ideal speaker-listener, in a completely homogeneous speech-community, who knows its (the speech community's) language perfectly and is unaffected by such grammatically irrelevant conditions as memory limitations, distractions, shifts of attention and interest, and errors (random or characteristic) in applying his knowledge of this language in actual performance. ~Chomsky,1965(p. 3)

Chomsky differentiates competence, which is an idealized capacity, from performance being the production of actual utterances. According to him, competence is the ideal speaker-hearer's knowledge of his or her language and it is the 'mental reality' which is responsible for all those aspects of language use which can be characterized as 'linguistic'. Chomsky argues that only under an idealized situation whereby the speaker-hearer is unaffected by grammatically irrelevant conditions such as memory limitations and distractions will performance be a direct reflection of competence. A sample of natural speech consisting of numerous false starts and other deviations will not provide such data. Therefore, he claims that a fundamental distinction has to be made between the competence and performance.

Chomsky dismissed criticisms of delimiting the study of performance in favor of the study of underlying competence, as unwarranted and completely misdirected. He claims that the descriptivist limitation-in-principle to classifying and organizing data, the practice of "extracting patterns" from a corpus of observed speech, and the describing of "speech habits" are core factors precluding the development of a theory of actual performance.

Other generativists
Linguistic competence is treated as a more comprehensive term for lexicalists, such as Jackendoff and Pustejovsky, within the generative school of thought. They assume a modular lexicon, a set of lexical entries containing semantic, syntactic and phonological information deemed necessary to parse a sentence. In the generative lexicalist view this information is intimately tied up with linguistic competence. Nevertheless, their models are still in line with the mainstream generative research in adhering to strong innateness, modularity and autonomy of syntax.

Ray S. Jackendoff
Ray S. Jackendoff's model deviates from the traditional generative grammar in that it does not treat syntax as the main generative component from which meaning and phonology is developed unlike Chomsky. According to him, a generative grammar consists of five major components: the lexicon, the base component, the transformational component, the phonological component and the semantic component.
Against the syntax-centered view of generative grammar(syntactocentrism), he specifically treats  phonology, syntax and semantics as three parallel generative processes, coordinated through interface processes. He further subdivides each of those three processes into various "tiers", themselves coordinated by interfaces. Yet, he clarifies that those interfaces are not sensitive to every aspect of the processes they coordinate. For instance, phonology is affected by some aspects of syntax, but not vice versa.

James Pustejovsky
In contrast to the static view of word meaning (where each word is characterized by a predetermined number of word senses) which imposes a tremendous bottleneck on the performance capability of any natural language processing system, Pustejovsky proposes that the lexicon becomes an active and central component in the linguistic description. The essence of his theory is that the lexicon functions generatively, first by providing a rich and expressive vocabulary for characterizing lexical information; then, by developing a framework for manipulating fine-grained distinctions in word descriptions; and finally, by formalizing a set of mechanisms for specialized composition of aspects of such descriptions of words, as they occur in context, extended and novel sense are generated.

Katz & Fodor
Katz and Fodor suggests that a grammar should be thought of as a system of rules relating the externalized form of the sentences of a language to their meanings that are to be expressed in a universal semantic representation, just as sounds are expressed in a universal semantic representation. They hope that by making semantics an explicit part of generative grammar, more incisive studies of meaning would be possible. Since they assume that semantic representations are not formally similar to syntactic structure, they suggest a complete linguistic description must therefore include a new set of rules, a semantic component, to relate meanings to syntactic and/or phonological structure. Their theory can be reflected by their slogan "linguistic description minus grammar equals semantics".

Critiques
A broad front of linguists have critiqued the notion of linguistic competence, often severely. Functionalists, who argue for a  usage-based approach to linguistics, argue that linguistic competence is derived from and informed by language use, performance, taking the directly opposite view to the generative model. As a result, in functionalist theories, emphasis is placed on experimental methods to understand the linguistic competence of individuals.

Sociolinguists have argued that the competence/performance distinction basically serves to privilege data from certain linguistic genres and socio-linguistic registers as used by the prestige group, while discounting evidence from low-prestige genres and registers as being simply mis-performance.

Noted linguist John Lyons, who works on semantics, has said: 
 Chomsky's use of the term performance to cover everything that does not fall within the scope of a deliberately idealized and theoretically restricted concept of linguistic competence, was perhaps unfortunate.

Dell Hymes, quoting Lyons as above, says that "probably now there is widespread agreement" with the
above statement.

Many linguists including M.A.K. Halliday and Labov have argued that the competence/performance distinction makes it difficult to explain language change and grammaticalization, which can be viewed as changes in performance rather than competence.

Another critique of the concept of linguistic competence is that it does not fit the data from actual usage where the felicity of an utterance often depends largely on the communicative context.

Neurolinguist Harold Goodglass has argued that performance and competence are intertwined in the mind, since, "like storage and retrieval, they are inextricably linked in brain damage."
 
Cognitive Linguistics is a loose collection of systems that gives more weightage to semantics, and considers all usage phenomenon including metaphor and language change. Here, a number of pioneers such as George Lakoff, Ronald Langacker, and Michael Tomasello have strongly opposed the competence-performance distinction.  The text by Vyvyan Evans and Melanie Green write:
"In rejecting the distinction between competence and performance cognitive linguists argue that knowledge of language is derived from patterns of language use, and further, that knowledge of language is knowledge of how language is used." p. 110

Critique in psycholinguistics
Numerous experiments on infants in the last two decades have shown that they are able to segment words (frequently co-occurring sound sequences) from other sounds in a stream of meaningless syllables.  This together with computational results that recurrent neural networks can learn syntax-like patterns, resulted in a wide questioning of nativist assumptions underlying psycholinguistic work up to the nineties.

According to experimental linguist N.S. Sutherland, the task of psycholinguistics is not to confirm Chomsky's account of linguistic competence by undertaking experiments. It is by doing experiments, to find out what are the mechanisms that underlie linguistic competence.  Psycholinguistics generally reject the distinction between performance and competence.

Psycholinguists have also decried the competence-performance distinction on the ability to model dialogue: 
 Dialogue sits ill with the competence/performance distinction assumed by most generative linguistics (Chomsky, 1965), because it is hard to determine whether a particular utterance is "well-formed" or not (or even whether that notion is relevant to dialogue). Dialogue is inherently interactive and contextualized.

Pragmatics and communicative competence

The narrow definition of competence espoused by generativists resulted in the field of pragmatics where concerns other than language have become dominant.  This has resulted in a more inclusive notion called communicative competence, to include social aspects – as proposed by Dell Hymes.   This situation has had some unfortunate side effects:

Having grown up in opposition to linguistics, pragmatics has largely dispensed with grammar; what theoretical input it has had has been drawn from strands in philosophy and sociology rather than linguistics.  [But this is a] split between two aspects of what to me is a single enterprise: that of trying to explain language. It seems to me that both parts of the project are weakened when they are divorced one from the other.

The major criticism towards Chomsky's notion of linguistic competence by Hymes is the inadequate distinction of competence and performance. Furthermore, he commented that it is unreal and that no significant progress in linguistics is possible without studying forms along with the ways in which they are used. As such, linguistic competence should fall under the domain of communicative competence since it comprises four competence areas, namely, linguistic, sociolinguistic, discourse and strategic.

Related areas of study
Linguistic competence is commonly used and discussed in many language acquisition studies. Some of the more common ones are in the language acquisition of children, aphasics and multilinguals.

Child language

The Chomskyan view of language acquisition argues that humans have an innate ability – universal grammar – to acquire language. However, a list of universal aspects underlying all languages has been hard to identify.

Another view, held by scientists specializing in Language acquisition, such as Tomasello, argues that young children's early language is concrete and item-based which implies that their speech is based on the lexical items known to them from the environment and the language of their caretakers. In addition, children do not produce creative utterances about past experiences and future expectations because they have not had enough exposure to their target language to do so. Thus, this indicates that the exposure to language plays more of a role in a child's linguistic competence  than just their innate abilities.

Aphasia

Aphasia refers to a family of clinically diverse disorders that affect the ability to communicate by oral or written language, or both, following brain damage. In aphasia, the inherent neurological damage is frequently assumed to be a loss of implicit linguistic competence that has damaged or wiped out neural centers or pathways that are necessary for maintenance of the language rules and representations needed to communicate. The measurement of implicit language competence, although apparently necessary and satisfying for theoretic linguistics, is complexly interwoven with performance factors. Transience, stimulability, and variability in aphasia language use provide evidence for an access deficit model that supports performance loss.

Multilingualism

The definition of a multilingual is one that has not always been very clear-cut. In defining a multilingual, the pronunciation, morphology and syntax used by the speaker in the language are key criteria used in the assessment. Sometimes the mastery of the vocabulary is also taken into consideration but it is not the most important criteria as one can acquire the lexicon in the language without knowing the proper use of it.

When discussing the linguistic competence of a multilingual, both communicative competence and grammatical competence are often taken into consideration as it is imperative for a speaker to have the knowledge to use language correctly and accurately. To test for grammatical competence in a speaker, grammaticality judgments of utterances are often used. Communicative competence on the other hand, is assessed through the use of appropriate utterances in different setting.

Understanding humour
Language is often implicated in humor. For example, the structural ambiguity of sentences is a key source for jokes.  Take Groucho Marx's line from Animal Crackers: "One morning I shot an elephant in my pajamas; how he got into my pajamas I'll never know." The joke is funny because the main sentence could theoretically mean either that (1) the speaker, while wearing pajamas, shot an elephant or (2) the speaker shot an elephant that was inside his pajamas.

Propositions by linguists such as Victor Raskin and Salvatore Attardo have been made stating that there are certain linguistic mechanisms (part of our linguistic competence) underlying our ability to understand humor and determine if something was meant to be a joke. Raskin puts forth a formal semantic theory of humor, which is now widely known as the semantic script theory of humor (SSTH). The semantic theory of humour is designed to model the native speaker's intuition with regard to humor or, in other words, his humor competence. The theory models and thus defines the concept of funniness and is formulated for an ideal speaker-hearer community i.e. for people whose senses of humor are exactly identical. Raskin's semantic theory of humor consists of two components – the set of all scripts available to speakers and a set of combinatorial rules. The term "script" used by Raskin in his semantic theory is used to refer to the lexical meaning of a word. The function of the combinatorial rules is then to combine all possible meaning of the scripts. Hence, Raskin posits that these are the two components which allows us to interpret humor.

See also
 Communicative competence
 Linguistic performance

Notes

References

External links
 Competence vs Performance in Linguistic research
 Linguistic Competence and Performance from Principia Cybernetica Web
 Understanding Linguistic Competence vs Performance - A Quick Note
 Some Comments on Competence and Performance by George A. Miller, The Rockefeller University
 Foundations of Language: Brian, Meaning, Grammar, Evolution Review of Ray Jackendoff
 The 'Language Instinct' Debate by Geoffrey Sampson (E-Book)

Psycholinguistics
Generative linguistics
Cognitive linguistics
Noam Chomsky